= Grand Beach Complex =

Formation cropping out in Newfoundland

- Stratigraphic range: Early Devonian–Late Devonian
- Type: Formation
- Unit of: Grand Beach Complex

Lithology
- Primary: Volcaniclastics

Location
- Region: Newfoundland
- Country: Canada
- Occurrence of the Grand Beach Complex in southeastern Newfoundland

The Grand Beach Complex is a formation cropping out in Newfoundland.
